Mohamed Keita may refer to:
 Mohamed Keita (footballer), Guinean footballer
 Mohamed Keita (basketball), Guinean-Burkinabé basketball player

See also
 Muhamed Keita, Norwegian footballer